Jan Noorduijn ( – ) was a Dutch male footballer. He was part of the Netherlands national football team, playing 4 matches. He played his first match on 15 March 1914.

See also
 List of Dutch international footballers

References

1889 births
1957 deaths
Dutch footballers
Netherlands international footballers
Footballers from Nijmegen
Association football forwards
FC Dordrecht players